Grayson is an unincorporated community in Miami County, in the U.S. state of Ohio.

History
A post office called Grayson was established in 1865, and remained in operation until 1888. Besides the post office, Grayson had a large grain elevator.

References

Unincorporated communities in Miami County, Ohio
Unincorporated communities in Ohio